Kentavros (Greek: Κένταυρος) is a large village in the municipality of Myki, in the Xanthi regional unit of Greece. Population 2,313 (2001).

Populated places in Xanthi (regional unit)